The Rifle No. 5 Mk I, was a derivative of the British Lee–Enfield No. 4 Mk I, Following experience of jungle fighting in the Pacific War, the British came to "the conclusion that a rifle shorter and lighter than the standard issue, bolt action .303 cal No. 4 rifle was required." However its operational use was in post-war colonial campaigns such as the Malayan emergency, where it gained its common nickname of the "Jungle Carbine."

Production began in March 1944, and finished in December 1947.

Development
Experience of jungle fighting in 1943 identified that mobility was critical and to that end the weight of equipment carried by the individual soldier needed to be reduced. The requirement for a rifle was a "light handy weapon with good accuracy to 400 yards []"

The first tests of the rifles took place in 1944 during which a flash hider was added.
The rifle was officially introduced into service in September 1944 with 20,000 produced; by end of 1944 50,000 had been accepted for service.

Design
The No. 5 was about  shorter and nearly a kilogram lighter than the No. 4 from which it was derived. A number of "lightening cuts" were made to the receiver body and the barrel, the bolt knob drilled out, woodwork cut down to reduce weight and had other new features like a flash suppressor and a rubber buttpad to help absorb the increased recoil and to prevent slippage on the shooter's clothing while aiming. Unlike modern recoil pads the No. 5 buttpad significantly reduced the contact area with the user's shoulder, increasing the amount of felt recoil of the firearm.
In official recoil tests, the No. 4 rifle yielded  average free recoil energy and the No. 5 carbine . Of the No. 5 carbine  extra recoil energy  was caused by adding the conical flash suppressor (muzzle shroud).
It was used in the Far East and other Jungle-type environments (hence the "Jungle Carbine" nickname) and was popular with troops because of its light weight (compared to the SMLE and Lee–Enfield No. 4 Mk I rifles then in service) and general ease of use, although there were some concerns from troops about the increased recoil due to the lighter weight.

Due to the large conical flash suppressor, the No 5 Mk I could only mount the No. 5 blade bayonet, which was also designed to serve as a combat knife if needed.

A No. 5 Mk 2 version (or, more accurately, versions, as several were put forward) of the rifle was proposed including changes such as strengthening the action to enable grenade-firing, and mounting the trigger from the receiver instead of on the trigger guard, but none of them was ever put into production and there was subsequently no No. 5 Mk 2 rifle in service. Similarly, a number of "takedown" models of No. 5 Mk I rifle intended for Airborne use were also trialled, but were not put into production.

Military service

The rifle was first issued to British airborne forces in Norway towards the end of the Second World War; these were troops that were likely to be sent to the Far East for an invasion of Japan.
The term was colloquial and never applied by the British Armed Forces, but the Rifle No. 5 Mk I was informally referred to as a "Jungle Carbine" by British and Commonwealth troops during the Malayan Emergency.

"Wandering Zero"

One of the complaints leveled against the No. 5 Mk I rifle by soldiers was that it had a "wandering zero" – i.e., the rifle could not be "sighted in" and then relied upon to shoot to the same point of impact later on. This condition is accurately referred to as an inability to zero, which would require this ability. 

Tests conducted during the mid to late 1940s appeared to confirm that the rifle did have some accuracy issues, likely relating to the lightening cuts made in the receiver, combined with the presence of a flash suppressor on the end of the barrel, and the British Government officially declared that the Jungle Carbine's faults were "inherent in the design" and discontinued production at the end of 1947.

However, modern collectors and shooters have pointed out that no Jungle Carbine collector/shooter on any of the prominent internet military firearm collecting forums has reported a confirmed "wandering zero" on their No. 5 Mk I rifle, leading to speculation that the No. 5 Mk I may have been phased out largely because the British military did not want a bolt-action rifle when most of the other major militaries were switching over to semi-automatic rifles such as the M1 Garand, SKS, FN Model 1949 and MAS-49.

Nonetheless, it has also been pointed out by historians and collectors that the No. 5 Mk I must have had some fault not found with the No. 4 Lee–Enfield (from which the Jungle Carbine was derived), as the British military continued with manufacture and issue of the Lee–Enfield No. 4 Mk 2 rifle until 1957, before finally converting to the L1A1 SLR.

No reports of wandering zero are explained by the inability to truly "zero" the "tangent sights" used on SMLE rifles and there also exist no reports or demonstrations of "Jungle Carbines" maintaining or returning to "zero". The massive amount of barrel length removed from SMLE rifles as different "marks" were developed could easily explain why the "Jungle Carbine" has nothing like the reputation for accuracy and precision other "marks" are praised for despite having the shortest, most-rigid and presumably the newest barrels available. Unless, of course, successive "marks" of SMLE rifles are/were "overhauled" rather than new production rifles with cleaning rod-worn muzzle rifling and crowns removed by "cutting down" old barrels. 

That each "new" mark is/was at the least the same length as earlier rifles and often shorter by multiple inches at the expense of velocity, energy and - according to some who believe longer barrels are better - accuracy; and reductions in velocity would affect the calibration of "tangent sights" suggests that "Jungle Carbines" were and are a bridge too far in "economically" overhauling old, hardly-fired but heavily-handled and excessively-cleaned rifles. 

The most common cause of worn-out muzzles, crowns and rifling is daily cleaning of unused rifles with steel cleaning rods from the muzzle end.

Post-war non-military conversions

Though they did not invent the name, the designation "Jungle Carbine" was used by the Golden State Arms Corporation in the 1950s and 1960s to market sporterised military surplus Lee–Enfield rifles under the "Santa Fe" brand. Golden State Arms Co. imported huge numbers of SMLE Mk III* and Lee–Enfield No. 4 rifles and converted them to civilian versions of the No. 5 Mk I and general sporting rifles for the hunting and recreational shooting markets in the US, marketing them as "Santa Fe Jungle Carbine" rifles and "Santa Fe Mountaineer" rifles, among other names.

This has led to a lot of confusion regarding the identification of actual No. 5 Mk I "Jungle Carbine" rifles, as opposed to the post-war civilian sporting rifles marketed under the same name. The easiest way to identify a "Jungle Carbine" rifle is to look for the markings on the left hand side of the receiver; a genuine No. 5 will have "Rifle No 5 Mk I" electrostencilled there, while a post-war conversion will generally have either no markings or markings from manufacturers who did not make the No. 5 Mk I (for example, Savage or Long Branch). Santa Fe "Jungle Carbine" rifles are so marked on the barrel.

Companies such as the Gibbs Rifle Company and Navy Arms in the U.S. have produced and sold completely re-built Enfields of all descriptions, most notably their recent "#7 Jungle Carbine" (made from Ishapore 2A1 rifles) and the "Bulldog" or "Tanker" carbine rifles, which are also fashioned original SMLE and No. 4 rifles.

Notes

References
 
 
 
 
National Rifle Association of America; "Lee-Enfield No. 5 'Jungle Carbine': An exploded view".  American Rifleman August 12, 2020

External links

 

World War II infantry weapons of the United Kingdom
Carbines
Bolt-action rifles of the United Kingdom
.303 British rifles